Aslambek Ediev (born 4 January 1970) is a former Russian  weightlifter, who competed in the 76 kg division from 1993-1998 until the International Weightlifting Federation changed the body weight categories, and then 85 kg after 1998.

Career
Ediev participated in the men's -85 kg class at the 2006 World Weightlifting Championships and won the silver medal, finishing behind Andrei Rybakou. He snatched 172 kg and jerked an additional 201 kg for a total of 373 kg, 10 kg behind winner Rybakou. in 2007 Ediev won silver medal with total of 372 kg behind Andrei Rybakou

Major results

References

Living people
1970 births
Russian male weightlifters
Place of birth missing (living people)
Russian people of Chechen descent
Chechen sportsmen
European Weightlifting Championships medalists
World Weightlifting Championships medalists
20th-century Russian people
21st-century Russian people